This is a purported list of ancient humans remains, including mummies, that may have been DNA tested. Provided as evidence of the testing are links to the mitochondrial DNA sequences, and/or to the human haplogroups to which each case has been assigned. Also provided is a brief description of when and where they lived. Entries lacking a citation should be viewed with skepticism; in particular, cases with no sequence or haplogroup links, with citation, have no evidentiary basis for appearing.

mtDNA tests

The following mummies have undergone an mtDNA (mitochondrial DNA) test, of remains with the indicated name, from the indicated locations:

DNA tests

The following mummies have undergone DNA tests, of remains with the indicated name, from the indicated locations:

See also
Ancient DNA
Cambridge Reference Sequence
Human mitochondrial DNA haplogroup
List of genetic results derived from historical figures
List of mummies

References

Further reading
 
 The Seven Daughters of Eve by Bryan Sykes.

External links
 Famous DNA
 Ancient DNA
 British teacher finds long-lost relative: 9,000-year-old man
 Unravelling the mummy mystery - using DNA
 Evidence of the Past: A Map and Status of Ancient Remains

 
Genetic genealogy
DNA
Human population genetics
Kinship and descent
Egyptology
Archaeology of Italy
History of Peru
DNA